George Catelyn was an English politician who sat in the House of Commons between 1571 and 1581.

Catelyn was elected Member of Parliament (MP) for Rochester, Kent in 1571 and held the position until 1581.

Catelyn lived at a moated manor house at Bradbourne near East Malling, Kent. He was connected to the Twysden family through his wife and mother who were both Roydons. He had no heir and sold the property to Richard Manningham.

References

People from Rochester, Kent
Year of birth missing
Year of death missing
English MPs 1571
English MPs 1572–1583